The Portuguese Catholic diocese of Vila Real has existed since 1922. In that year it was formed from territories in the diocese of Bragança-Miranda, archdiocese of Braga, and diocese of Lamego. It is a suffragan of the archdiocese of Braga, in the Norte region, with its see at the Cathedral of Vila Real.

Notes

Vila Real
Vila Real, Roman Catholic Diocese of